Cam Christiansen is a Canadian animator, most noted for his 2017 feature documentary film Wall.

He previously directed the animated short films I Have Seen the Future (2007), The Real Place (2009) and Five Hole: Tales of Hockey Erotica (2009).

Originally from Edmonton, Alberta, he studied painting and animation at the Alberta College of Art and Design.

References

External links

Canadian animated film directors
Canadian documentary film directors
Artists from Edmonton
Film directors from Edmonton
Living people
Canadian people of Danish descent
Year of birth missing (living people)